Khaledabad Rural District is a rural district (dehestan) in Emamzadeh District, Natanz County, Isfahan Province, Iran. As of the 2006 census, its population was 3,338, in 813 families.  The rural district has 4 villages.

References 

Rural Districts of Isfahan Province
Natanz County